Miss America 1993 was the 66th Miss America pageant, which was held on September 19, 1992.

The winner, Leanza Cornett, was the first Miss Florida to take the crown. She later became a television personality for programs such as Entertainment Tonight and was married to ET host Mark Steines.

Top 10 finalist Robin Meade of Ohio is currently a news anchor on the HLN television network program Morning Express with Robin Meade.

Results

Placements

Order of announcements

Top 10

Top 5

Awards

Preliminary awards

Non-finalist awards

Quality of Life awards

Judges
Donna Axum†
Faith Daniels
Michael Dorn
Dann Florek
Susan Stroman
Cindy Williams
Paul Wylie

Candidates

References

External links
 Miss America 1993(not valid)

1993
1992 in the United States
1993 beauty pageants
1992 in New Jersey
September 1992 events in the United States
Events in Atlantic City, New Jersey